The National Defense Authorization Act for Fiscal Year 2016 (NDAA 2016, Pub.L. 114-92) is a United States federal law which specifies the budget and expenditures of the United States Department of Defense (DOD) for Fiscal Year 2016.

Role of the bill
To authorize appropriations for fiscal year 2016 for military activities of the Department of Defense and for military construction, to prescribe military personnel strengths for such fiscal year, and for other purposes.

Bill vetoed
On September 30, 2015, President Barack Obama threatened to veto the NDAA 2016. The reason for the veto threat by the Obama administration was that the bill  bypassed the Budget Control Act of 2011 spending caps by allocating nearly $90 billion to the Overseas Contingency Operations (OCO) account, designating routine spending as emergency war expenses exempted from the caps. On October 22, 2015, Obama vetoed the bill.

However, after changes it became S. 1356 (114th) which was signed by the President on November 25, 2015.

See also
List of bills in the 114th United States Congress
National Defense Authorization Act

References

External links

General tracking of the bill:
H.R. 1735

Proposed legislation of the 114th United States Congress
Cannabis law in the United States
U.S. National Defense Authorization Acts